Hato Nuevo may refer to:

Hato Nuevo, Guaynabo, Puerto Rico, a barrio
Hato Nuevo, Gurabo, Puerto Rico, a barrio
Hatonuevo, a town and municipality in La Guajira Department,  Colombia